Benedita Souza da Silva Sampaio (born 26 April 1942) is a Brazilian politician. From a humble background, she faced class and racial prejudice, overcoming it to become the first female and Afro-Brazilian governor of the State of Rio de Janeiro and, later, Minister of the said Secretary of State as well in the Government of Luiz Inácio Lula da Silva.

Origin
Benedita Souza da Silva Sampaio was born on 26 April 1942 in Praia do Pinto, Rio de Janeiro, to Ovídia da Silva and is one her mother's 13 children. Benedita da Silva is also known as Bene.

Background
According to Da Silva, her mother's matriarchal tendencies have profoundly influenced her development. She grew up in the favela of Chapéu Mangueira in Copacabana. Da Silva was raped at the age of seven. She had several miscarriages and a baby that died soon after birth. At 16 she started working with the community school of the Chapéu Mangueira favela where she established a women's association and a women's branch of the Rio de Janeiro Federation of Favelas. She worked as a nursing aide and studied Social Studies. At the age of 40, Da Silva received her high-school diploma. She attended college at the same time as her 20-year-old daughter. During this period she also married a man named Manshino.

After Manshino's death, Da Silva became involved in community service, where she met her second husband Bola. Bola inspired her politically and coordinated her campaign, which resulted in Da Silva's historic election as the first Workers' Party governor in Rio. Five years later, Da Silva became a widow for the second time. She would later meet her new husband, the actor Pitanga, as she campaigned for as a senator candidate. These relationships and the dynamics of Brazilian life combined with her activism propelled Da Silva to political prominence and controversy.

She did so at a time when both women and black people were not visible in Brazil's political process. Neither the loss of two husbands nor the hostility of the Brazilian press deterred her politically.

Current
Today, she is an advocate of women's rights both in Brazil and Latin America. Egalitarianism is her goal, not just for her constituents but to persons everywhere who are adversely affected by prejudice and poverty. According to Da Silva, "Racial democracy only exists in school books and official speeches; the elite in Brazil have promoted the myth of racial harmony to make people accept certain forms of discrimination and to deny the need for affirmative action."  As a member of the African diaspora which came to the Americas as a result of the Maafa, and which stills suffer discrimination around the world based in the social relations constructed thereafter, Mrs Da Silva through her career is a figure who reinforces the benefits of full citizenship for racial minorities in Latin America.

Political career

 1982 - Elected city councilor of Rio de Janeiro for the Worker's Party.
 1986 - Elected to the National Congress; fought to make amendments to the Brazilian Constitution on racial crimes, 120 days maternity leave, prohibition of difference of wages, and right of the prison inmates to breast-feed their children.
 1994 - Elected to the Senate, becoming the first female senator in Brazil.
 1998 - Became Vice-Governor of the State of Rio de Janeiro on the Anthony Garotinho ticket.
 2002 - With Governor Anthony Garotinho resigning to run for president, Da Silva assumes the Governorship of the State of Rio de Janeiro, becoming the first woman and the first black person to occupy the office.
 2003 - Leaving the State government, Silva takes the post of Social Action Secretary, where she remains until January 2004.
 2006 - Assumed the general coordination of the campaign of re-election of current president Luiz Inácio Lula da Silva in the state of Rio de Janeiro. Some periodicals speculated that, she would run for mayor of the City of Rio de Janeiro in 2008. It didn't happen.

Benedita da Silva's journey to political leadership alone is enough to make a statement regarding her character and determination. Da Silva's biography, "Benedita da Silva: An Afro-Brazilian woman's story of politics and love", tells, through a collection of interviews, of her hardships and successes while conveying her message to members of her audience. Through the novel, da Silva is able to impact its readers while also bringing to light the many issues that a prominent in Brazil, particularly in the Brazilian Favelas. She exposes prominent and controversial issues such as abortion, poverty, rape and sexual abuse, and inequality that plagued her personally.

Da Silva's background and personal reputation as “three times a minority” (black, poor, and woman), she says gives her a perspective into the lives of her electorate. Her struggles and ethnicity make her relatable to the citizens in which she has leadership over. This type of advantage makes for a more insightful, diverse, and conscientious political leader.

She is a devout Pentecostal and draws much of her ideology from the progressive wing of the Pentecostal movement in Brazil.  She describes herself as a "PTcostal."

References

See also
 Afro-Brazilians

|-

|-

|-

1942 births
Living people
Afro-Brazilian people
Governors of Rio de Janeiro (state)
Vice Governors of Rio de Janeiro (state)
Workers' Party (Brazil) politicians
Members of the Chamber of Deputies (Brazil) from Rio de Janeiro (state)
Members of the Federal Senate (Brazil)
Brazilian politicians of African descent
Brazilian Pentecostals
Women state governors of Brazil
20th-century Brazilian women politicians
Women city councillors in Brazil
21st-century Brazilian women politicians